Grapsus is a genus of lightfoot crabs, comprising the following species:
Grapsus albolineatus Latreille in Milbert, 1812
Grapsus adscensionis (Osbeck, 1765)
Grapsus fourmanoiri Crosnier, 1965
Grapsus grapsus (Linnaeus, 1758)
Grapsus granulosus Milne-Edwards, 1853
Grapsus intermedius De Man, 1888
Grapsus longitarsis Dana, 1851
Grapsus tenuicrustatus (Herbst, 1783)

'Grapsus' is a New Latin modification of Greek 'grapsaios' meaning 'crab'.

Gallery

References

Grapsidae
Decapod genera
Taxa named by Jean-Baptiste Lamarck
Articles containing video clips